Larry Flick is an American journalist, former dance music columnist, single reviewer, and Senior Talent Editor for Billboard magazine, where he worked for 14 years. Now he produces and hosts Sirius XM radio shows. Flick started in the music business at 21 as a college radio rep at a company called Gold Mountain. He went on the road as a touring assistant to the Power Station and KISS during their 1980s heyday, before starting as a part-time assistant/mail sorter at Billboard. He later became the dance music/single reviews editor of the magazine. Flick also worked as a music consultant for Prince.

References

External links
Larry Flick on Sirius XM
Larry Flick on Discogs.com

Flick on Linked in

Living people
American music critics
American music journalists
Year of birth missing (living people)